The Twin Falls Original Townsite Residential Historic District in Twin Falls, Idaho is a  historic district which was listed on the National Register of Historic Places in 2001.

The district is roughly triangular, and roughly bounded by Blue Lakes Ave., Addison Ave., 2nd Ave. E, and 2nd Ave. W.  It included 929 buildings, of which 624 were contributing buildings.

The district includes the Bickel School and the Lincoln School, both of which are listed separately on the National Register.

References

Historic districts on the National Register of Historic Places in Idaho
Twin Falls County, Idaho